The OMA Instant Messaging and Presence Service (IMPS) is an Open Mobile Alliance enabler for Instant Messaging and Presence.  The Wireless Village consortium developed the first cut of the specifications. After Wireless Village was merged with OMA, its specs became OMA IMPS 1.0 specifications.  IMPS is widely deployed but not necessarily marketed.  Interworking between several operators IMPS platforms is being performed under a GSMA initiative that encourages interworking and deployment of Instant Messaging.

Vanilla terminals often have IMPS clients.

On Nokia, the chat client is accessed via the "My Presence" menu.

On Sony Ericsson, it's called "My Friends".

On Motorola, it's called "IM". The phones' chat clients are generally designed to be provider neutral, so you have to put in the Wireless Village server settings.

If your phone doesn't have an inbuilt chat client, you might still be able to get a third-party chat application that runs on your phone's Symbian, Java ME, BREW, or other application environment. You need to get a chat client which is "Wireless Village compliant presence-enabled".

Note that it is still necessary for the operator to provide the IM service and/or one will have to connect to a third party server for connection with others for IM'ing.

Compatible terminals
This is only a partial list.
Nokia
1680 classic, 2630, 3120c, 3220, 3500, 5300 express music, 3600 slide, 6020, 6021, 6120, 6220, 6230, 6230i, 6300, 6630, 6820, 5140, 6810, 7200, 7260, 7270, 7610, 8800, E50, E51, E60, E61, E62, E63, E65, E70, E71, E72, N70, N72, N73, N95
Motorola
V500, V600, E398, V3, V3xx, ZN5
Sony Ericsson
K310, J300i, F500i, K300i, K310i, K500i, K510i, K550i, K600i, K610i, K700i, K750i, K790i, K800i, K850i, S700i, T206, T630, T637, V800, W550i, W595, W200i, W800i, W810i,  W850i, W880i, W900i, Z500A, Z750, Z800, Z1010
Siemens AG
CX70, CX75, M65, SK65, S75
BenQ-Siemens
S68, E71, EL71, M81

See also
Wireless Village
Open Mobile Alliance - an industry consortium that manages the IMPS specification

External links
IMPS specification V.1.3a
IMPS specification V.1.2.1
IMPS specification V.1.1

Open Mobile Alliance standards
Instant messaging protocols
Mobile telecommunications standards
Mobile telecommunication services
IMS services